Michel Charbonneau (born September 23, 1948) is a Canadian politician, who represented the electoral district of Saint-Jean in the National Assembly of Quebec from 1989 to 1994.

Born and raised in Napierville, Quebec, Charbonneau served as a municipal councillor and mayor of Napierville before being elected to the legislature in the 1989 election. In the legislature, he served as chair of a task force on reform of trucking regulations in the province.

In the 1994 election, he was initially declared to have been narrowly defeated by Roger Paquin of the Parti Québécois. After a judicial recount, however, the two were found to have finished in an exact tie, necessitating a new by-election to determine the winner. Paquin won the by-election.

Electoral record

References

External links
Michel Charbonneau at the National Assembly of Quebec

1948 births
Living people
Quebec Liberal Party MNAs
20th-century Canadian legislators
People from Montérégie
Mayors of places in Quebec